Maite Perroni Beorlegui (born 9 March 1983) is a Mexican actress, singer, songwriter and producer.

Perroni gained international fame in 2004 as a member of the Latin Grammy-nominated Latin pop group RBD.

As an actress, Perroni's career began in 2004 and since then she has starred in numerous television series'. She gained acclaim in 2009 when she was named "The New Queen of Telenovelas" by Univision.  In 2016 she won the Premios TVyNovelas of Best Actress of the Year for her work in Antes muerta que Lichita.

Perroni is more recently known for starring in the Mexican telenovela Rebelde and the Netflix series Dark Desire

In 2012, Perroni signed a contract with Warner Music Group and the following year Perroni released her first solo album Eclipse de Luna (2013), which debuted in the third position at Amprofon Top 20, the main table of Mexican albums, and got to ninth position on the Billboard Latin Albums and second in Latin Pop Albums.

Biography

Early life 

Maite Perroni Beorlegui was born in Mexico City but grew up in Guadalajara until age 12, when her family moved back to Mexico City. She has two younger brothers, Adolfo (born in 1986) and Francisco (born in 1992). In early childhood, Perroni had an inclination towards acting and appeared in many TV commercials and in some music videos. In school she was involved in acting, art, singing and dancing.

She also participated as a dancer in a Disney Channel show. After graduating from high school, Perroni signed up for the Centro de Educación Artística (CEA), an acting school run by Televisa, and signed up for a three-year course, though it only took her two years to complete. She graduated and landed the role Guadalupe "Lupita" Fernandez, in the Mexican telenovela Rebelde. She was one of the six protagonists alongside Anahí, Dulce María, Christian Chávez, Alfonso Herrera, and Christopher von Uckermann. The series lasted three seasons.

Through the musical group she was a part of, RBD, she is a recording artist, performing sold-out concerts throughout Brazil, Mexico, Spain and Ecuador. Her first solo album, Eclipse de Luna, was released on the Warner Brothers label in August 2013, and was considered a commercial success. It quickly climbed to number 3 on the Mexican Albums Chart and number 2 on the Billboard Latin Pop Albums chart.

In 2014, she launched her own clothing line, known as Colección Maite Perroni. She has hosted prestigious awards shows such as the 2015 "Lo Nuestro Awards" and "The 25th Annual Hispanic Heritage Awards Ceremony." She has 8 million followers on Facebook, over 4 million on Twitter, more than 9 million on Instagram, and more than 2 million YouTube subscribers.

In 2012, Maite voiced the lead roles in the Spanish language versions of several movies such as the DreamWorks' movie "El Origen de los Guardianes" (Rise of the Guardians) being "El Hada de los Dientes" (Tooth Fairy), Nahuala Film's "Selección Canina" (Canine's National Football Team) as "Maite Terranova" and Lionsgate's "Un Gallo con Muchos Huevos" (Little Rooster's Egg-cellent Adventure) as "Di".

Maite's TV career began when she starred in the telenovela (soap opera) "Rebelde". From the show came the musical group RBD, which featured Maite as a lead singer. She helped carry the group to worldwide recognition and acclaim; they won several awards including "Best Group of the Year," "Best album of the Year," "Best Concert," and "Best Song of the Year." RBD has sold over 50 million records and entirely sold venues such as "Estadio Maracaná" in Brazil, Madison Square Garden in New York, L.A. Coliseum, American Airlines Arena in Miami, Estadio Vicente Calderón in Spain, Auditorio Nacional and Palacio de los Deportes in Mexico City among others.

Her popularity was cemented in 2008 when she was selected by Mexico's youth to become one of the first Latin women to have an iconic Barbie doll fashioned after her. The Maite Perroni Barbie was a success in Mexico, elsewhere in Latin America, the United States, and Spain.

She has won numerous awards including the Tvynovelas Award's "Best Young Actress" for the soap opera, "Cuidado con el Ángel" (Don't mess with an Angel), Tvynovelas Award's "Most Popular Social Media Artist 2011", "Alta Inspiration Award 2016" by Alta Med, Tvynovelas Award's "Best Actress in a Leading Role" and "Favorite Leading Actress" at the "Premios Juventud 2016" both for the soap opera "Antes Muerta Que Lichita" (Anything But Plain).

She released her first solo album in 2013, entitled "Eclipse de Luna" (Moon Eclipse). The release of the music video for the album's first single, "Tu y Yo" was during the "Premios Juventud 2013" (2013 Youth Awards), which aired on Univision and was seen by over 13 million viewers. The CD reached No. 2 on the U.S. Latin Pop Charts.

In July 2016, she released a new single, Adicta. Its official video has over 7.5 million views on YouTube. During that year she also won numerous music awards such as "Best Latin Female Artist / Best Latin Female Video - Adicta" at the "Latin Music Italian Awards 2016" and "Latin Artist of the Year" by "La Caja de Música" in Spain.

Renowned for her beauty, Maite was selected to be among the top ten of the "100 Most Beautiful Faces 2016" by TC Candler - the only Mexican on the list for 5 years in a row. She has also made "The 50 Most Beautiful People in the World" list by People Magazine En Español for 8 years running. Maite has been an ambassador for the brand Proactiv in the U.S. Hispanic market for a long time.

Maite is fluent in Spanish and English. She is an Ambassador for PADF, an organization with the mission of raising awareness and combatting child labor. Variety picked Maite as one of the "Top 10 Latinas to Watch" in 2015
Maite is a longtime time Brand Ambassador for Proactiv in the U.S. Hispanic market.

She also has a record deal with Warner Music.

Career

Acting career 

Perroni made her acting debut starring in Rebelde, a remake of the acclaimed Argentine novela Rebelde Way. She portrayed Guadalupe "Lupita" Fernández, a teenage girl from a lower-class family who gets the opportunity to study at the fictitious Elite Way School. Rebelde ran from 2004 to 2006, filming 440 episodes.

Following the success of Rebelde in 2007, Televisa released RBD: La Familia, which starred the members of RBD. The characters of the sitcom were not based on the band's characters in Rebelde, but intended to be similar to the actors' real personalities. RBD: La Familia was the first Mexican show shot entirely in high definition and ran from March 14, 2007, to June 13, 2007, and only lasted 13 episodes.

In 2008, she starred as the lead character in Cuidado con el ángel, opposite William Levy. The show had great success around the world. She starred in her third leading role in Mi Pecado opposite Eugenio Siller. She was part of the third season of Mujeres Asesinas in the sixth episode called Las Blanco, Viudas along with Diana Bracho, Luz Maria Aguilar, and Mark Tacher.

In 2009, Perroni was named the new queen of the telenovelas by Univision.

In 2010, Maite was confirmed to star with her previous co-star, William Levy, in Triunfo del Amor, a remake of the Venezuelan classic Cristal.

In 2012, Perroni was confirmed to star with Pedro Fernandez in Cachito de Cielo, her fifth lead role.

In 2014, it was confirmed that Perroni was to star in her sixth lead role in a telenovela called La Gata along with Daniel Arenas, Erika Buenfil, and Laura Zapata. It aired on May 5, 2014.

On July 12, 2014, People en Español named Perroni the new queen of Mexican telenovelas.

In 2015, Perroni landed her seventh lead role next to Arath De La Torre, called "Antes muerta que Lichita". It became a hit right away in Mexico and the U.S., where she was invited to promote it, as she has a huge fanbase in North America.

Then in 2017, she landed her eighth lead role with Sebastian Rulli, called "Papá a toda madre". More recently, she signed an overall deal with Pantaya.

Musical career 

Perroni was a member of the popular band RBD, which was launched off of the success of the most-watched telenovela in years, Rebelde. To date, RBD has made 9 studio albums, including albums in Spanish, Portuguese, and English. They have sold over 15 million albums worldwide, and have embarked on various international tours including shows throughout Latin America and Europe.

Mai composed "Tal Vez Mañana", for RBD's fourth Spanish language album, Empezar Desde Cero and sang solo on the title track for the album.

On August 8, 2008, RBD released a message telling fans that they had decided to split up. They went on one final tour, Gira Del Adios World Tour, which ended in early 2009. Perroni was absent part of the tour, due to her filming of Cuidado con el ángel.

For her role in Cuidado con el ángel, Perroni recorded three songs for the show called "Esta Soledad", "Separada De Ti", and "Contigo".

She recorded a song with Reik, entitled "Mi Pecado", which was used as the opening song for the telenovela, Mi Pecado.

She recorded a song with Marco di Mauro called "A Partir De Hoy" which forms part of the musical soundtrack of the telenovela Triunfo del Amor, her fourth lead role.

In 2012, Perroni released a single called "Te daré mi corazón" that was used for her telenovola "Cachito de Cielo".

In late 2012, Perroni announced that she will record her first solo album called Eclipse de Luna.

On July 16, 2013, Perroni released a bachata song called "Tu y Yo".

In May 2014, Perroni released another bachata song called "Vas A Querer Volver" which is also the theme song for her soap opera La Gata.

In June 2014, Perroni released a duet song with Alex Ubago called "Todo lo que soy" which was the couple's theme song in the telenovela La Gata.

On July 14, 2016, Perroni released her first single called Adicta. She performed it at Premios Juventud 2016. It will be included in her new album soon to be released.

Products and endorsements 

Mai is the spokesmodel for NYX Cosmetics. In 2007, a Barbie doll version of Perroni was released based on her character in Rebelde.

In June 2009, Perroni announced her support for the Ecologist Green Party of Mexico.

Mai stars in commercials for Giraffas, Pepsi, Proactiv, Teleton, Pantene, and Coppel.

In fall 2014, Perroni partnered with National Stores to introduce her Coleccion Maite Perroni, a contemporary fashion line inspired by her favorite designers reflecting her own personal taste.  "Latinas who accept, love themselves... who want to look good and feel better, who maximize your qualities and analyze the defects you project onto the world...and discover that you love yourself and you are passionate... "And you know how to face life, how to live life, give life and be alive, who are who they are and don't follow stereotypes."

Personal life 
Perroni is currently living in Los Angeles, California. She was in a relationship with Chilean musician and producer Koko Stambuk from 2013 to 2020. 

As of 2021, Perroni has been dating producer Andrés Tovar. They announced their engagement in September 2022 and got married on October 9, 2022. On January 6, 2023, Perroni announced she is expecting her first child with Andrés Tovar via Instagram.

Discography

Albums

Singles

Duets

Promotional singles

Filmography

Films

Television

Achievements

TVyNovelas Award 
3 wins out of 10 nominations and 1 special award

Premios Juventud 
3 wins out of 11 nominations

People en Español Award 
2 wins out of 16 nominations

Kids' Choice Awards Mexico 
0 wins out of 3 nominations

Estilo DF 
1 win out of 1 nomination

GQ Men of the Year Awards 
1 win out of 1 nomination.

People en Español's 50 Most Beautiful 
12 consecutive years: 2008–2019

Solo tour

References

External links 

 Official Website
 Twitter Maite Perroni
 Official YouTube Channel
 Talent Agent's Official Mini-Site

1983 births
Living people
21st-century Mexican actresses
Singers from Guadalajara, Jalisco
Singers from Mexico City
Actresses from Mexico City
Mexican telenovela actresses
Mexican voice actresses
Actresses from Guadalajara, Jalisco
Mexican women singer-songwriters
Mexican singer-songwriters
Mexican women singers
Mexican women pop singers
Mexican people of Basque descent
Mexican people of Italian descent
Portuguese-language singers of Mexico
RBD members
Mexican LGBT rights activists
Women in Latin music